Broken Island is one of the Falkland Islands, in Byron Sound, due north of West Falkland.

Geography and geology
The island gains its name from its terrain which contains many bays, and inlets. It has a central portion in a circular shape, with one spit extending to the west,  and another to the east, in twisted fashion. It is shaped like and S on its side.

There are a number of small islets off it.

It is due south of Pebble Island and east of Golding Island.

References

Islands of the Falkland Islands